Revelations is the third studio album by American rapper Special Ed. It was released on June 27, 1995 via Profile Records. Recording sessions took place at Homeboy Studios, at Howie's Crib, at Dollar Cab Lab, at Power Play Studios, at D&D Studios, at Quad Recording Studios, and at Soundtrax Studio in New York City, at Jammy's Recording Studio in Kingston, and at Hi Class Studio. Production was handled by Akshun, Mark Sparks, Ahmad Wyatt, Dominic Owen, Fabian Hamilton, Father Shaheed, Howie Tee, O.C. Rodriguez and Special Ed. The album peaked at number 107 on the Billboard 200 album chart in the United States.

Track listing

Sample credits
Track 1 contains a sample of "Mortal Thought" by KRS-One
Track 2 contains a sample of "The Look of Love" by Isaac Hayes
Track 7 contains a sample of "P.L.O. Style" performed by Method Man
Track 8 contains a sample from "Come Clean" performed by Jeru the Damaja
Track 11 contains material performed by Da Youngsta's

Charts

References

External links

1995 albums
Special Ed albums
Profile Records albums
Albums produced by Howie Tee
Albums produced by Mark Sparks